Narberth A.F.C. are a Welsh football club from Narberth, Pembrokeshire in the southwest of Wales. They currently play in the Pembrokeshire League Division One.

History

The club's most successful period was in the late 1950s when the club won four championships in a row at the end of the decade.

Honours

 Pembrokeshire League Division One  - Champions (5): 1956–57; 1957–58; 1958–59; 1959–60; 1991–92
 Pembrokeshire League Division One  - Runners-Up (4): 1951–52; 1962–63; 1982–83; 1997–98
 Pembrokeshire League Division Three  - Runners-Up (1): 1983–84 (second team)
 Pembrokeshire League Reserves Division One – Champions (4): 1994–95; 1996–97; 2001–02; 2002–03 
 Pembrokeshire League Reserves Division One – Runners-Up (2): 1997–98; 1999–2000
 Pembrokeshire Senior Cup - Winners (3): 1947–48; 1956–57; 1994-95 1997–98
 Pembrokeshire Senior Cup - Runners-Up (6): 1951–52; 1963–64; 1988–89; 1999–2000; 2001–02; 2005–06
 West Wales Amateur Cup – Winners:: 1957–58

References

External links
Official club Facebook
Official club Twitter

Football clubs in Wales
Sport in Pembrokeshire
Pembrokeshire League clubs